The Green Party of Canada fielded seventy-nine candidates in the 1997 federal election, none of whom were elected.  Information about some of these candidates may be found on this page.

Ontario

Scarborough Southwest: David James Cooper

Cooper was a journalist at the time of the election.  According to the Toronto Star newspaper, he ran for the Green Party due to a belief that supporting Canada's more established parties would simply encourage "apathy, cynicism, mediocrity and corruption".  His campaign called for "environmentally sound programs, local democracy, sustainable development and long-term planning" (Toronto Star, 30 May 1997).

Alberta

Calgary Southwest: Sol Candel

Sol Candel holds a Bachelor of Arts degree from the University of Toronto, and a Master's degree from the London School of Economics.  He is a longtime resident of Calgary, Alberta, where he owns the Movie Poster Shop, a business that collects and displays vintage movie posters.  He has been a member of the Green Party for several years,  and is the party's financial agent for the electoral division of Calgary Centre-North as of 2009.  He is also a director of the Earth System Science/Gaia Theory Society of Alberta, and a partner in Seven Generations Development Inc.

References

 
Green Party of Canada candidates in Canadian Federal elections
candidates in the 1997 Canadian federal election